Felix Schnyder (5 March 1910 – 8 November 1992) was a Swiss lawyer and diplomat. He served as Chairman of UNICEF in 1960 and as United Nations High Commissioner for Refugees from 1960 to 1965.

Career
Schnyder studied law and joined the Swiss diplomatic service in 1940. He was posted to Moscow, Berlin and Washington D.C. In 1958 he was appointed the Swiss Permanent Observer to the United Nations in New York. He was elected to the UNICEF Executive Board and served as Chairman in 1960. From 1960 to 1965 he was the third United Nations High Commissioner for Refugees, in succession to August R. Lindt.

References

Chairmen and Presidents of UNICEF
United Nations High Commissioners for Refugees
1910 births
1992 deaths
20th-century Swiss lawyers
Place of birth missing
Swiss officials of the United Nations